Deal Lake is a man-made lake  in Monmouth County, New Jersey. It is the largest lake in the county and one of the largest lakes in New Jersey, occupying 158 acres and drains into the Atlantic Ocean.

Deal Lake, like many urban and suburban bodies of water experienced serious environment pollutant problems in the mid 20th century, in 1974 the Deal Lake Commission was formed to help save the lake.

Deal is a freshwater lake, but is unique because it has spawning saltwater fish, including alewives, blueback herring and gizzard shad.

History
Deal Lake has gone by many names over the years including Lake Uliquecks, White's Pond, Hogs Swamp Pond, Corlies Pond, Great Pond and Boyleston Great Pond.

Originally an estuary of the Atlantic Ocean, Deal Lake was altered starting in 1890 to its present form, with the closing off the inlet from the ocean and creation of several separate lakes and ponds. Deal Lake was a model system of the late 19th century for flood control and storm water management. Over time, the lake lured many to build along its banks. Today, almost the entire shoreline has been developed with many homes built within the 100-year flood plain.

In the late 1890s, the Ross Fenton Farm was established as a popular entertainment spot on the Wanamassa banks of Deal Lake.

References

Reservoirs in New Jersey
Lakes of Monmouth County, New Jersey
Allenhurst, New Jersey
Deal, New Jersey
Interlaken, New Jersey
Asbury Park, New Jersey
Loch Arbour, New Jersey
Neptune Township, New Jersey
Ocean Township, Monmouth County, New Jersey